Jerry Scott Kutzler (born March 25, 1965) is an American former baseball pitcher. A right-handed starting pitcher, Kutzler appeared in seven games for Major League Baseball's (MLB) Chicago White Sox in the 1990 season. He earned his first MLB victory by defeating the Toronto Blue Jays 5–4 in the first game of his major league career on April 28, 1990. Overall, he posted a 2–1 won–loss record and a 6.03 earned run average. Kutzler pitched for nine seasons in the United States professional system and one in the Mexican League with Guerreros de Oaxaca. He now teaches physical education at Lance Middle School in Kenosha, Wisconsin.

References

External links
Baseball-Reference (Minors)
Retrosheet
Venezuelan Professional Baseball League statistics

1965 births
Albuquerque Dukes players
American expatriate baseball players in Canada
American expatriate baseball players in Mexico
American expatriate baseball players in Venezuela
Baseball players from Illinois
Birmingham Barons players
Caribes de Oriente players
Charlotte Knights players
Chicago White Sox players
Guerreros de Oaxaca players
Gulf Coast White Sox players
Living people
Major League Baseball pitchers
Mexican League baseball pitchers
Omaha Royals players
Peninsula White Sox players
Sportspeople from Waukegan, Illinois
San Antonio Missions players
Tampa White Sox players
Vancouver Canadians players
William Penn Statesmen baseball players
Winston-Salem Spirits players